29th Corps, XXIX Corps or 29th Army Corps may refer to:

 29th Corps (People's Republic of China)
XXIX Army Corps (Wehrmacht)
 29th Army Corps (Russian Empire)
 29th Army Corps (Soviet Union)
 29th Rifle Corps (Soviet Union)
 29th Tank Corps, Soviet Union

See also
List of military corps by number
 29th Army (disambiguation)
 29th Battalion (disambiguation)
 29th Brigade (disambiguation)
 29th Division (disambiguation)
 29 Squadron (disambiguation)